During the 35th through 37th Congresses, Minnesota elected its two members of the United States House of Representatives at-large statewide on a general ticket. Minnesota then elected a member (considered the 10th seat) to an at-large seat 1913-1915, with the remaining nine representatives elected in districts.  Minnesota elected all its members at large for the 73rd Congress, ending the practice two years later.

List of members representing the district

1858-1863: Two seats

1913–1915: One seat 
Elected statewide as the 10th Representative

1933–1935: Nine seats 
Elected statewide at-large on a general ticket.

References

 Congressional Biographical Directory of the United States 1774–present

At-large
Former congressional districts of the United States